A Snow Capped Romance is the second studio album by American metalcore band 36 Crazyfists. It was released on March 16, 2004, by Roadrunner Records. "At the End of August" and "Bloodwork" were released as singles, the latter of which was featured in the 2004 film Resident Evil: Apocalypse.

In 2016, Metal Hammer named A Snow Capped Romance one of the most underrated Roadrunner Records albums.

Track listing

Personnel

36 Crazyfists 
Brock Lindow – vocals
Steve Holt – guitar, backing vocals and production
Mick Whitney – bass
Thomas Noonan – drums

Guests 
Raithon Clay – additional vocals on "Destroy the Map"
Sarah Reeder – spoken word on "Installing the Catheter"

Production 
James Paul Wisner – production, engineering and editing
Mark Green – assistant engineering and editing
Andy Sneap – mixing and mastering
Marc Loren – assistant engineering
Norma Mendoza – vocal coaching
Monte Conner – A&R
Josh Rothstein – photography
Berit Monsen-Keene – photography

References

Snow Capped Romance, A
Snow Capped Romance, A
Snow Capped Romance, A
Albums produced by James Paul Wisner